The 2016 South American Basketball Championship for Women was the 35th edition of the tournament. Nine teams featured the competition, held in Barquisimeto, Venezuela from May 20 – 26.

Preliminary round

Group A

Group B

Classification 5th-6th places

Final round

Semifinals

Third place game

Final

Final standings

References

External links
Official website

2016 in women's basketball
Women
Bask
International basketball competitions hosted by Venezuela
South American Basketball Championship for Women
May 2016 sports events in South America